"Push! Push!" is a song by Falco. It was first released as the lead single from his posthumous 1999 greatest-hits album The Final Curtain – The Ultimate Best of.

Background and writing 
The song is credited to Falco and Voyce. The recording was produced by Jeo.

Commercial performance 
The song reached no. 9 in Austria and no. 50 in Germany.

Track listings 
Promo 10" vinyl maxi single EMI Electrola P 520 534 (Germany, 1998)
 A. "Push! Push!" (Jeo Extended Mix) (5:30)
 B. "Push! Push!" (Dee Jay Sören Extended Mix) (5:00)
 		 	 
Promo CD single EMI Electrola CDP 520.527 (Germany, 1998)
 "Push! Push!" (Jeo Radio Mix) (3:45)

CD maxi single Electrola 865 812 6 (EMI) (18 January 1999)
 "Push! Push!" (Jeo Radio Mix) (3:45)
 "Push! Push!" (Dee Jay Sören Radio Mix) (3:30)
 "Geld" (3:46)

Charts

References

External links 
 Falco – "Push!_Push!" at Discogs

1999 songs
1999 singles
Falco (musician) songs
Songs written by Falco (musician)
Electrola singles
EMI Records singles